Sir Mark Andrew O'Regan  (born 1953) is a New Zealand lawyer and jurist. He was the President of the Court of Appeal of New Zealand until his elevation to the Supreme Court of New Zealand in 2014.

Biography
Educated at St. Patrick's College, Silverstream, he graduated from Victoria University of Wellington. He was admitted as a barrister and solicitor of the High Court in 1977 and became a partner with the law firm Chapman Tripp in 1984. As a lawyer, he was known particularly for his expertise in relation to commercial law. He co-authored the New Zealand Law Commission paper which led to the eventual adoption of a register for personal property securities in New Zealand.

He was appointed to the High Court in 2001 and to the Court of Appeal in January 2004. He was elevated to the Supreme Court in 2014.

In the 2013 New Year Honours, O'Regan was appointed a Knight Companion of the New Zealand Order of Merit for services to the judiciary.

References

1953 births
Living people
20th-century New Zealand lawyers
Victoria University of Wellington alumni
Court of Appeal of New Zealand judges
High Court of New Zealand judges
People educated at St. Patrick's College, Silverstream
Place of birth missing (living people)
Knights Companion of the New Zealand Order of Merit
21st-century New Zealand judges